Jennifer Savidge is an American actress, best known for her role as Nurse Lucy Papandrao in the NBC medical drama series, St. Elsewhere. She is married to actor Robert Fuller.

Career
Savidge has appeared in a number of television shows. From 1982 to 1988, she was regular cast member in the NBC medical drama series, St. Elsewhere. She played the role of Nurse Lucy Papandrao. During 1990s, Savidge has appeared in several made for television movies, and guest starred on L.A. Law, Lois & Clark: The New Adventures of Superman, Sisters, Star Trek: Deep Space Nine and Beverly Hills, 90210. Her film credits include Clifford (1994), Magic Kid 2 (1994), True Crime (1996), Evolution (2001), Searching for Sonny (2011), and Rudderless (2014).

From 2000 to 2005, Savidge had the recurring role as Commander Amy Helfman in the CBS procedural, JAG. In 2015, she played Ruth Taylor in the first season of ABC critically acclaimed drama series, American Crime.

Savidge studied acting under Milton Katselas. Her work on Broadway included portraying Hilda in The Night of the Iguana (1976) and Lady of Verona in Romeo and Juliet (1977). She also performed on stage in regional theater productions. Between plays she found other employment, including managing a restaurant and managing an art gallery.

Personal life
Savidge was born in Alameda County, California. She married actor Robert Fuller in Los Angeles on May 19, 2001. They began living on a ranch in Dallas, Texas, in 2004.

Filmography

Film

Television

References

External links
 

20th-century American actresses
21st-century American actresses
American television actresses
Living people
People from Alameda County, California
Year of birth missing (living people)
American stage actresses
Broadway theatre people